In mathematics, a non-empty collection of sets  is called a -ring (pronounced "") if it is closed under union, relative complementation, and countable intersection. The name "delta-ring" originates from the German word for intersection, "Durschnitt", which is meant to highlight the ring's closure under countable intersection, in contrast to a -ring which is closed under countable unions.

Definition 

A family of sets  is called a -ring if it has all of the following properties:

Closed under finite unions:  for all 
Closed under relative complementation:  for all  and
Closed under countable intersections:  if  for all 

If only the first two properties are satisfied, then  is a ring of sets but not a -ring. Every -ring is a -ring, but not every -ring is a -ring.

-rings can be used instead of σ-algebras in the development of measure theory if one does not wish to allow sets of infinite measure.

Examples 

The family  is a -ring but not a -ring because  is not bounded.

See also

References 

 Cortzen, Allan. "Delta-Ring." From MathWorld—A Wolfram Web Resource, created by Eric W. Weisstein. http://mathworld.wolfram.com/Delta-Ring.html

Measure theory
Families of sets